Merigomish   is a community in the Canadian province of Nova Scotia, located in  Pictou County.

The Canadian Gaelic poet Iain mac Ailein's 1826 poem Òran a' Bhàil Ghàidhealaich ("The Song of the Gaelic Ball"), was composed for and first performed at a gathering organized by David Murray at Merigomish and to which only Gaelic speakers were invited. The song remains very popular among Gaelic-speakers in both Scotland and Nova Scotia and is often referred to by its first line, Bithibh Aotrom 's Togaibh Fonn ("Be Light-hearted and Raise a Tune").

Navigator

See also
St. Paul's Presbyterian Church Merigomish

References

External links
Merigomish on Destination Nova Scotia

The name Merigomish comes from the Mi'makq Indian meaning "A place of merrymaking".

Communities in Pictou County
General Service Areas in Nova Scotia